Kowloon East was a geographical constituency in the election for the Legislative Council of Hong Kong in 1991, which elects two members of the Legislative Council using the dual-seat constituency dual vote system. The constituency covers Yau Tsim District, Mong Kok District, and Sham Shui Po District in Kowloon.

The constituency was divided and replaced by the Kowloon East and Kowloon South-east constituencies in 1995.

Returned members
Elected members are as follows:

Election results

References 

Constituencies of Hong Kong
Kowloon
Constituencies of Hong Kong Legislative Council
1991 establishments in Hong Kong
Constituencies established in 1991